Basil Gage Catterns (20 June 1886 – 5 February 1969) was the Chief Cashier and Deputy Governor of the Bank of England.

He was born in Oswaldtwistle, Lancashire, son of the Rev. T.E.S. Catterns and educated at Trent College, Nottinghamshire. He was the uncle of the Australian businessman, citizen soldier and amateur yachtsman Basil W. T. Catterns.

He spent five years with Manchester & Liverpool District Bank (later the District Bank) in Accrington and joined the Bank of England in 1908, becoming Assistant Chief Cashier in 1923 and Chief Cashier on 27 March 1929. He was replaced as Chief Cashier on 17 April 1934 by Kenneth Peppiatt. He then served as an Executive Director of the Bank and eventually as Deputy Governor from 1936 to his retirement in 1945. He was appointed High Sheriff of the County of London for 1940–41.

He married Evelyn Nancy Dodd. Their son John Burleigh was killed when his Spitfire crashed in 1945.

References

1886 births
1969 deaths
Chief Cashiers of the Bank of England
Deputy Governors of the Bank of England
High Sheriffs of the County of London
20th-century English businesspeople